Lynn Randolph (born 19 December 1938) is an American artist.

Biography
Lynn Randolph grew up in Port Arthur, Texas, an oil refinery town on the Gulf Coast.  She earned a BFA from the University of Texas in Austin. Shortly thereafter, she moved to Houston, where she has lived and painted ever since. Her paintings have been exhibited and reproduced widely in the US and internationally.

In 1989–1990, she won a fellowship to the Bunting Institute at Radcliffe/Harvard, where she lived and worked at the center in Cambridge, Ma. In the summer of 1987, she was awarded a fellowship at Yaddo in Saratoga Springs, NY.

Lynn Randolph's paintings have been exhibited and collected in permanent museum collections and other public and private institutions including: The Bunting Institute at Radcliffe/Harvard; The National Museum of Women in the Arts, Washington, D.C.; Arizona State University Art Museum, Tempe, Arizona; The San Antonio Museum of Art; The Museum of Fine Arts Houston; the Menil Collection, Houston; M.D. Anderson Hospital Palliative Care Houston, and the Blanton Museum of Art , the University of Texas at Austin.

From 1990 to 1996, Randolph participated in a collaborative exchange with the eminent feminist theorist Donna Haraway. Their engagement with specific ideas relating to feminism, techno-science, political consciousness and other social issues, formed the images and narrative of Haraway's book, ModestWitness@Second-Millennium:FeMaleMan-Meets-OncoMouse™. Her paintings have appeared in many other texts, not as collaborations, but as they inform topics such as feminism, religion, cultural studies and contemporary art. Randolph’s paintings appeared in Deborah J. Haynes book The Vocation of the Artist in a chapter entitled “Visionary Imagination”. Her paintings opened each new part and chapter in a text book entitled Comparing Religions by Jeffrey J. Kripal.

For most of her professional life, Lynn Randolph has been involved with civil and human rights issues. She was a charter member and chapter president of the Houston Women’s Caucus for Art, and a member of the WCA’s national board. In 1988, she co-chaired the national meetings in Houston. In 1984, she was the co-organizer for Artists Call against US intervention in Central America. In 1992, she joined a woman’s drum corps and performed as an activist until 1997. In 1993, Randolph went to El Salvador with curator Marilyn Zeitlin to help organize an exhibition of Salvadorean artists called Art Under Duress, El Salvador 1980 to the present. The show was seen at Lawndale Art Center where Randolph also served as a board member.

Randolph’s painting entitled The Coronation of Saint George was the cover image for The Nation magazine during the 2004 Republican National Convention in NY.

In 2008, Lynn Randolph became an artist in residence at M.D. Anderson Cancer Center where she works on the palliative care unit. Here she considers herself a translator helping patients realize their memories, dreams and reflections on their lives through art.

Education
Randolph received her B.F.A from the University of Texas at Austin in 1961.

References

1938 births
Living people
American feminist writers
Artists from Texas
Writers from Houston
University of Texas at Austin alumni
20th-century American women artists
20th-century American artists
20th-century American women writers
20th-century American writers
21st-century American women artists
21st-century American artists
21st-century American women writers
People from Port Arthur, Texas